Visible Wind was a Canadian progressive rock band from the province of Québec formed in 1983.

Band members
 Stephen Geysens - keyboards, vocals
 Luc Hébert - drums
 Louis Roy - bass guitar
 Philippe Woolgar - guitar, vocals (albums 1,2,5 and 6)
 Claude Rainville - guitar (albums 3 and 4)

Discography
Studio albums
 Catharsis (1988)
 A Moment Beyond Time (1991)
 Emergence (1994)
 Narcissus Goes to the Moon (1996)
 Barb-à-Baal-a-Loo (2001)
Live albums
 La Dæmentia Romantica (Live in Mexicali) (2006)

References

External links
 http://www.aei.ca/vwind

Canadian progressive rock groups
Musical groups from Montreal
Musical groups with year of establishment missing